Birds of Tokyo are an Australian alternative rock band from Perth.

Birds of Tokyo may also refer to:

 Birds of Tokyo (album), their eponymous 2010 album
 Birds of Tokyo (EP), their eponymous 2005 EP

See also
 
 Birds (disambiguation)
 Tokyo (disambiguation)